The South Pacific Ocean or "South Pacific" is the Southern Hemisphere portion of the Pacific Ocean.

South Pacific may also refer to:

Arts and entertainment
 South Pacific (novel), a 1992 book by James A. Michener

TV, film and theater
 South Pacific (musical), a 1949 musical play by Rodgers and Hammerstein
 South Pacific (1958 film), an adaptation
 South Pacific (2001 film), a television production
 South Pacific, a 1943 play by Howard Rigsby and Dorothy Heyward and staged on Broadway by Lee Strasberg
 Survivor: South Pacific, the 23rd season of the American TV show Survivor, which took place in Samoa
 South Pacific (TV series), a 2009 BBC nature documentary series
 South Pacific Television, a former New Zealand broadcasting company

Music
 Southpacific, a space rock band from Canada
 South Pacific (Decca album), a 1949 album featuring Bing Crosby
 South Pacific (soundtrack), a soundtrack released in 1958
 South Pacific in Hi-Fi, a 1958 jazz album by the Chico Hamilton Quintet
 "South Pacific", a 1993 song by the Verve from Voyager 1

Other uses
 University of the South Pacific, a public university with locations across a dozen countries
 South Pacific Area, a multinational U.S.-led military command active during World War II

See also
 List of islands in the Pacific Ocean
 North Pacific (disambiguation)
 Pacific Ocean Areas (command)
 Pacific Ocean theater of World War II
 South Pacific Airlines of New Zealand, operating from 1960 to 1966
 South Pacific Applied Geoscience Commission, an inter-governmental regional organisation
 South Pacific Commission, former name of the Secretariat of the Pacific Community
 South Pacific Division of Seventh-day Adventists, one of the 13 world divisions of the church
 South Pacific Tourism Organisation, an inter-governmental body for the tourism sector
 South Pacific Trade Commission, former name of the Pacific Islands Trade and Investment Commission
 South West Pacific theatre of World War II, a theatre of the war between the Allies and Japan